Montana Highway 38 (MT 38), also known as Skalkaho Road or Skalkaho Highway is a state highway in the US state of Montana approximately  long.  It provides seasonal direct land connections between the communities of Hamilton on the west and Phillipsburg and Anaconda on the east via Skalkaho Pass.

The highway and the  pass take their name from the Salish word Sq̓x̣q̓x̣ó, "many trails".

Route description
Initially, the highway heads south along a former section of US 93. The road takes an abrupt turn eastward as it passes through Grantsdale, begins its meandering climb southeast along Skalkaho Creek and northeast along Daly Creek through the Sapphire Mountains, turning southeast again before it crosses Skalkaho Pass.

Except for its westernmost and easternmost segments, MT 38 is mostly gravel.

Winter closure

Scenic routes
Skalkaho Highway is part of, or links to, these scenic routes:
 The Skalkaho Highway Scenic Byway
 Phillipsburg Scenic Loop (MT 38, Rock Creek Road, Montana Secondary Highway 348 and MT 1)
 Rock Creek Road Back Country Byway (connects to Interstate 90 east of Clinton at exit 126)
 Pintler Scenic Route (MT 1)

Major intersections

See also

References

External links

 Skalkaho Highway from dangerousroads.org
 

038
Transportation in Ravalli County, Montana
Transportation in Granite County, Montana